Andrew McFarlane may refer to:

Andrew McFarlane (Australian actor) (born 1951), Australian actor
Andrew McFarlane (judge) (born 1954), British judge
Andrew McFarlane (motorcyclist) (1977–2010), Australian motocross racer
Andy McFarlane (born 1966), English footballer
Andy McFarlane (cricketer) (1899–1972), Irish cricketer

See also 
Andrew Macfarlane (d.1819), Anglican clergyman